The Racine Rhinos are a women's professional American football team based in Racine, Wisconsin. A member of the Women's Spring Football League, the Rhinos are set to begin play for its second season in 2011.

External links
Racine Rhinos website
WSFL website

Sports in Racine, Wisconsin
American football teams in Wisconsin
Women's Spring Football League teams
2011 establishments in Wisconsin
American football teams established in 2011
Women's sports in Wisconsin